Heterophyes nocens is a species of trematodes, or fluke worms, in the family Heterophyidae.

Distribution
This species occurs in:
 southwestern Korea in coastal regions
 Kōchi Prefecture, Chiba Prefecture, Yamaguchi Prefecture, Chūgoku region, Hiroshima Prefecture, and Shizuoka Prefecture in Japan
 China.

Life cycle
The first intermediate hosts of Heterophyes nocens include brackish water snail Cerithideopsilla cingulata.

The second intermediate host include freshwater fish: Mugil cephalus, and Acanthogobius flavimanus.

Natural definitive hosts are fish-eating animals: cats, and humans. It can infect humans when eating raw fish. Experimental definitive hosts are: dogs and cats.

References

External links
 

Heterophyidae
Animals described in 1916